Earl Cawdor, of Castlemartin in the County of Pembroke, is a title in the Peerage of the United Kingdom. It was created in 1827 for John Campbell, 2nd Baron Cawdor.

This branch of Clan Campbell descends from Sir John Campbell (died  1546), third son of Archibald Campbell, 2nd Earl of Argyll (whose eldest son Colin was the ancestor of the Dukes of Argyll; see the latter title for earlier history of the family). His descendant Pryse Campbell (d. 1768) represented Nairnshire in the House of Commons. His son John Campbell was Member of Parliament for Nairnshire and Cardigan. In 1796 he was raised to the Peerage of Great Britain as Baron Cawdor, of Castlemartin in the County of Pembroke.

He was succeeded by his eldest son, the second Baron. He represented Carmarthenshire in Parliament and served as Lord Lieutenant of Carmarthenshire. In 1827 he was created Viscount Emlyn, of Emlyn in the County of Carmarthen, and Earl Cawdor, of Castlemartin in the County of Pembroke. These titles were in the Peerage of the United Kingdom. His son, the second Earl, was Member of Parliament for Pembrokeshire and Lord Lieutenant of Carmarthenshire. He was succeeded by his eldest son, the third Earl. He was a Conservative politician and served briefly as First Lord of the Admiralty in 1905. Lord Cawdor was also Lord Lieutenant of Pembrokeshire and Chairman of the Great Western Railway.

 the titles are held by his great-great-grandson, the seventh Earl, who succeeded his father in 1993. He is also the 25th Thane of Cawdor.

Several other members of this branch of the Campbell family may be mentioned. Sir George Campbell, younger brother of the first Baron, was an admiral in the Royal Navy. The Hon. George Pryse Campbell, second son of the first Baron, was a rear-admiral in the Royal Navy. Brigadier-General John Vaughan Campbell, who was awarded the Victoria Cross in 1916, was the second son of Captain the Hon. Ronald George Elidor Campbell, second son of the second Earl. Colonel the Hon. Ian Malcoln Campbell, third son of the third Earl, was Lord Lieutenant of Nairnshire. Liza Campbell is the second daughter of the sixth Earl.

The family seat is Cawdor Castle near Cawdor, Nairnshire, associated also with the ancient title Thane of Cawdor. Other family seats in the past included Golden Grove in Carmarthenshire, Wales, which was bequeathed to John Campbell, 1st Earl Cawdor by his friend, John Vaughan, after his death in 1804, and also Stackpole Court in Pembrokeshire, Wales, acquired by the marriage of Alexander Campbell to Elizabeth Lort.

Barons Cawdor (1796)
John Campbell, 1st Baron Cawdor (1753–1821)
John Frederick Campbell, 2nd Baron Cawdor (1790–1860) (created Earl Cawdor in 1827)

Earls Cawdor (1827)
John Frederick Campbell, 1st Earl Cawdor (1790–1860)
John Frederick Vaughan Campbell, 2nd Earl Cawdor (1817–1898)
Frederick Archibald Vaughan Campbell, 3rd Earl Cawdor (1847–1911)
Hugh Frederick Vaughan Campbell, 4th Earl Cawdor (1870–1914)
John Duncan Vaughan Campbell, 5th Earl Cawdor (1900–1970)
Hugh John Vaughan Campbell, 6th Earl Cawdor (1932–1993)
Colin Robert Vaughan Campbell, 7th Earl Cawdor (b. 1962)

The heir apparent is the present holder's son James Chester Campbell, Viscount Emlyn (b. 1998).

See also
Duke of Argyll
Clan Campbell

References

Further reading
Davies, John E. The Changing Fortunes of a British Aristocratic Family: The Campbells of Cawdor and their Welsh Estates, 1689-1976 (Boydell Press, 2019)
Kidd, Charles, Williamson, David (editors). Debrett's Peerage and Baronetage (1990 edition). New York: St Martin's Press, 1990.

External links

Cawdor Castle
Cawdor Estate

Earldoms in the Peerage of the United Kingdom
Noble titles created in 1827
Noble titles created for UK MPs